Klang Beer is a Cambodian beer. It is brewed at the Cambrew Brewery in Sihanoukville.

References

External links
Website

Beer in Cambodia